Richard Goodman (born April 23, 1987) is a former American football wide receiver. He attended Florida State University, as a member of the 2010 graduating class. Shortly after the draft ended, Goodman joined the San Diego Chargers as an undrafted free agent.

Personal life
Goodman was born in Ft. Lauderdale, Florida on April 23, 1987. In 2005, he graduated from St. Thomas Aquinas High School. Goodman chose to attend to Florida State over Auburn and NC State.

College career
Goodman had a few starts for Florida State, but was hindered mostly by injuries throughout his college career.

Professional career
After going undrafted in the 2010 NFL Draft, Goodman signed with the San Diego Chargers as an undrafted free agent on May 10, 2010; he was later cut and signed to the practice squad before the regular season.

Goodman was signed from the Chargers practice squad to the active roster on October 12, 2010, for a one-year contract. Goodman was cut by the Chargers on November 6, 2010 to make room for Steve Gregory, who was returning from a suspension. Goodman was re-signed to the Chargers' practice squad. On January 1, 2012, Goodman returned a second quarter kickoff for a touchdown against the Oakland Raiders. It was the first Chargers' kickoff return for a touchdown since 2008.

On September 2, 2013, Goodman was released by the Chargers.

References

External links
Florida State Seminoles bio
San Diego Chargers bio

1987 births
Living people
American football wide receivers
Florida State Seminoles football players
San Diego Chargers players
Players of American football from Fort Lauderdale, Florida
St. Thomas Aquinas High School (Florida) alumni